Craggs is an unincorporated community in Gilchrist County, Florida, United States.

Geography

References

Unincorporated communities in Gilchrist County, Florida
Unincorporated communities in Florida